The 2021 Liga Futebol Amadora was the fifth season of the Liga Futebol Amadora Primeira Divisão. The season began on 12 November and finished on 23 December 2021. 

Lalenok United were the defending champions.

Karketu Dili won their second Liga Futebol Amadora title and qualified for the 2022 AFC Cup in the play-off round. Though, they did not participate because they didn't have an AFC license.

Most games took place at the 5,000-capacity National Stadium.

League table

Result table

Notes

References

External links
Official website
Official Facebook page

LFA Primeira seasons
Timor-Leste